Ismet Rizvić was born in Mostar in 1933, but spent much of his life, and all of his working life, in Sarajevo, where he studied the fine arts at the Pedagogical College. As a scholarship-holder, he spent time in London in 1966, studying the English watercolourists. He first exhibited his works with the Artists' Association in 1957. He was a member of the Visual Artists' Association of Bosnia & Herzogovina from 1963. During his thirty-five years' work as an artist, he tool part in numerous joint exhibitions and held ten solo exhibitions. In addition to those that are in this country, many of Rizvić's works are to be found in private collections worldwide. He died on 9 December 1992 in Sarajevo. Twelve years later, in 2004, a monograph on the artist Ismet Rizvić was published, with 384 pages including 237 reproductions of his works - and who know how much of the artist's love.

References

1933 births
1992 deaths
Bosnia and Herzegovina expatriates in the United Kingdom
Artists from Mostar